Arbuthnot Lake, Arbuthnet Lake, or Lower Chain Lake is a lake in the Mount Baker Wilderness Area, in Whatcom County, Washington, United States. It is one of the Galena Chain lakes. At one end of the lake is "Arbuthnot Falls". The lake was named in 1906.

References

Further reading

Lakes of Washington (state)
Lakes of Whatcom County, Washington
Mount Baker-Snoqualmie National Forest